Kenas-e Olya (also Romanized as Kenās-e ‘Olyā; also known as Kannās, Kannās-e Zarghāmī, Kenās, Kenās-e Bālā, and Kenās-e Ẕarghāji) is a village in Hasanabad Rural District, Hasanabad District, Eqlid County, Fars Province, Iran. At the 2006 census, its population was 152, in 29 families.

References 

Populated places in Eqlid County